Geir Overskeid  (born 19 July 1963) is a Norwegian psychologist. He was born on July 19, 1963 in Levanger but was raised in Fredrikstad, and this is what he considers to be his hometown. He gained his Doctorate in psychology in 1995, and is currently professor of Cognitive psychology at the University of Oslo. Overskeid has, among other things, worked with questions connected to learning and motivation and the interplay between thoughts and feelings. He has co-edited the book Det ubeviste og moderne vitenskap (In English: The unconscious and modern science) and written the book Sprø som selleri: Hvor gærne psykologene egentlig er (og psykiaterne er enda verre), a funny take on international and Norwegian psychology.

Works

Papers

External links
  Geir Overskeid's home page
  Praise for Det ubeviste og moderne vitenskap 
 
 

1963 births
Living people
University of Oslo alumni
Norwegian psychologists
People from Levanger
People from Fredrikstad